Vasily Nikolaevich Anokhin (born 24 May 1983) is a Russian statesman who has been acting Governor of Smolensk Oblast since 17 March 2023 following the dismissal of Alexey Ostrovsky.

References 

Living people
1983 births
21st-century Russian politicians
Governors of Smolensk Oblast
Acting heads of the federal subjects of Russia